Kavalai Illaadha Manithan is a 1960 Indian Tamil-language film directed by K. Shankar, written and co-produced by Kannadasan. The film stars Chandrababu and Rajasulochana, with M. R. Radha, T. S. Balaiah, T. R. Mahalingam, M. N. Rajam, and L. Vijayalakshmi in supporting roles. It was released on 19 August 1960 and was not a commercial success.

Plot 

Muthu, a carefree man, is a lawyer who solves the problems of people, in stark contrast to his brother Manickam who believes in creating trouble for those around him, especially women. Their wealthy father Jamabulingam is money-minded and is least bothered about other things in life. Jamabulingam arranges the marriage of Manickam with a woman named Sivakami, but she loves another man named Dhamotharan. Manickam impregnates Kaveri, a poor woman, then disavows her and their child. Muthu manages to correct all the wrongs caused by Manickam, succeeds in bringing Sivakami and Dhamotharan together, and marries a woman named Sevanthi.

Cast 
Male cast
 Chandrababu as Muthu
 M. R. Radha as Manickam
 T. S. Balaiah as Jamabulingam
 T. R. Mahalingam as Dhamotharan
 Kannadasan as the chief guest at the convocation (uncredited)

Female cast
 Rajasulochana as Kaveri
 M. N. Rajam as Sivakami
 L. Vijayalakshmi as Sevanthi

Soundtrack 
The music was composed by Viswanathan–Ramamoorthy. Lyrics were by Kannadasan. The song "Pirakkum Podhum Azhuginraai" became popular.

Release and reception 

Kavalai Illaadha Manithan was released on 19 August 1960. The Indian Express wrote, "Raja Sulochana has done justice to her part. But there is no seriousness at all in Radha's acting and Chandrababu's seriousness is rendered ludicrous". Film historian Randor Guy noted that the film was not a commercial success, mainly because of the delay in its production. Kannadasan later remarked that, in contrast to the film's title which meant "the man without worries", he, as the producer, became "a much worried man in the process".

References

External links 
 

1960 films
1960s Tamil-language films
Films directed by K. Shankar
Films scored by Viswanathan–Ramamoorthy